The 2011 Women's EuroHockey Championship III was the fourth edition of the Women's EuroHockey Championship III, the third level of the women's European field hockey championships organized by the European Hockey Federation. It was held in Vienna, Austria from 25 to 31 July 2011.

Lithuania won its first EuroHockey Championship III title and were promoted to the 2013 EuroHockey Championship II together with the hosts Austria.

Results

Standings

Matches

See also
2011 Men's EuroHockey Championship III
2011 Women's EuroHockey Championship II

References

Women's EuroHockey Championship III
Women 3
EuroHockey Championship III
EuroHockey Championship III
Sports competitions in Vienna
International women's field hockey competitions hosted by Austria
EuroHockey Championship III
2010s in Vienna